Hermann II of Hesse (1341 – 24 May 1413) was Landgrave of Hesse from 1376 to 1413.

Hermann II, called "the Scholar", was born in 1345 in Burg Grebenstein (de) (Grebenstein castle), the son of Louis the Junker. Louis the Junker was a son of Otto I, Landgrave of Hesse. Hermann studied in Paris and in Prague.  After the death of Otto, the son and heir apparent of Henry II, the latter appointed his nephew Hermann as co-ruler and heir in 1367.

Hermann was married twice.  The first marriage on 3 February 1377 was to Johanna, countess of Nassau-Weilburg [-1383] but produced no children.  The second was on 15 October  1383 to Margaret of Hohenzollern-Nuremberg [-1406], daughter of Frederick V, Burgrave of Nuremberg.  They had the following children:
 Anna (1385–1386)
 Henry (1387–1394)
 Elisabeth (1388–1394).
 Margarete (1389–1446), married to Henry I of Brunswick-Lüneburg
 Agnes (1391–1471), married to Otto II of Brunswick-Göttingen
 Hermann (1396–1406)
 Frederick (1398–1402)
 Louis (1402–1458), succeeded as Landgrave of Hesse

External links 
 Hermann II: Digital images from Allgemeine deutsche Biographie, Bd.: 12, Hensel - Holste, Leipzig, 1880, p. 125 
Wikisource: Allgemeine Deutsche Biographie "Hermann II (Landgraf von Hessen)" (in German)

|-

1341 births
1413 deaths
People from Grebenstein
House of Hesse
Landgraves of Hesse
Burials at St. Elizabeth's Church, Marburg